Marksville is a small city in and the parish seat of Avoyelles Parish, Louisiana, United States. The population was 5,702 at the 2010 census, an increase of 165 over the 2000 tabulation of 5,537.

Louisiana's first land-based casino, Paragon Casino Resort, opened in Marksville in June 1994. It is operated by the federally recognized Tunica-Biloxi Indian Tribe, which has a reservation in the parish.

History

The land where Marksville was founded on was once a meeting place, leading to the present day Marksville Prehistoric Indian Site.

Marksville is named after Marc Eliche (Marco Litche or Marco de Élitxe, as recorded by the Spanish), a Venetian Jew who established a trading post after his wagon broke down in this area. He was a Sephardic Jewish trader believed to be from Venice. His Italian name was recorded by a Spanish priest as Marco Litche; French priests, who were with colonists, recorded his name as Marc Eliche or Mark Eliché after his trading post was established about 1794. Marksville was noted on Louisiana maps as early as 1809, after the United States acquired the territory in the Louisiana Purchase of 1803. Eliche later donated the land that became the Courthouse Square. It is still the center of Marksville, the parish seat.

Marksville's population has numerous families of Cajun ancestry, in addition to African Americans, European Americans, and persons of mixed European-African ancestry. Many of the families had ancestors here since the city was incorporated. .

Marksville became the trading center of a rural area developed as cotton plantations. After the United States outlawed the Atlantic slave trade in 1808, enslavers purchased African-American slaves through the domestic slave trade; a total of more than one million were transported to the Deep South from the Upper South in the first half of the 19th century. Enslavers typically bought slaves from markets in New Orleans, where they had been taken via the Mississippi River or by the coastal slave trade at sea. Solomon Northup, a free black from Saratoga Springs, New York, was kidnapped and sold into slavery in Louisiana. After being held for nearly 12 years on plantations in Avoyelles Parish, he was freed in 1853 with the help of Marksville and New York officials. Northup's memoir, which he published after returning to New York, was the basis of the 2013 movie 12 Years A Slave, of the same name.

2015 shooting of Jeremy Mardis

On March 31, 2017, Judge William Bennett of the 12th Judicial District Court sentenced Stafford to forty years' imprisonment for the manslaughter of Jeremy Mardis. He was given a concurrent fifteen years for the attempted manslaughter of Christopher Few. Judge Bennett denied Stafford's defense request for a new trial. Stafford told the court that he did not know Jeremy was strapped in the front seat of the father's vehicle when he fired the fatal shots. Meanwhile, Greenhouse will be tried beginning June 12 on second-degree and attempted second-degree murder counts.

Geography
Marksville is located at  (31.126595, −92.066073).

Demographics

2020 census

As of the 2020 United States census, there were 5,065 people, 2,145 households, and 1,150 families residing in the city.

2000 census
As of the census of 2000, there were 5,537 people, 2,036 households, and 1,400 families residing in the city. The racial makeup of the city was 51.98% White, 48.59% African American, 0.80% Native American, 0.27% Asian, 0.11% from other races, and 1.25% from two or more races. Hispanic or Latino of any race were 0.65% of the population.

There were 2,036 households, out of which 36.3% had children under the age of 18 living with them, 41.0% were married couples living together, 22.4% had a female householder with no husband present, and 31.2% were non-families. 27.8% of all households were made up of individuals, and 13.8% had someone living alone who was 65 years of age or older. The average household size was 2.57 and the average family size was 3.15.

In the city, the population was spread out, with 28.7% under the age of 18, 9.6% from 18 to 24, 27.2% from 25 to 44, 20.2% from 45 to 64, and 14.3% who were 65 years of age or older. The median age was 34 years. For every 100 females, there were 79.9 males. For every 100 females age 18 and over, there were 72.0 males.

The median income for a household in the city was $20,750, and the median income for a family was $25,681. Males had a median income of $24,896 versus $15,865 for females. The per capita income for the city was $11,546. About 32.0% of families and 34.8% of the population were below the poverty line, including 50.1% of those under age 18 and 25.4% of those age 65 or over.

Education
All primary public schools are run by the Avoyelles Parish School Board, which operates two schools within the city of Marksville. In January 2018, 5 children from Marksville died in a car accident while traveling through Gainesville, Florida.

Elementary
 Marksville Elementary

High school
 Marksville High School

Media

Newspaper 

 Avoyelles Journal

Radio

Notable people
D'Anthony Batiste (born 1982), Former University of Louisiana at Lafayette football player; former National Football League player; Canadian Football League player
Aaron Broussard, Jefferson Parish politician impacted by the political effects of Hurricane Katrina
Dylan Dauzat social media celebrity and model known for publishing YouTube videos and other content on Instagram, Twitter, Vine, and Facebook
Edwin Edwards, four-term Governor of Louisiana
Elaine Schwartzenburg Edwards, US senator in 1972
H. Claude Hudson, civil rights activist and founder of Broadway Federal Savings and Loan
Matthew "Boogie Jake" Jacobs, blues musician 
Jeannette Knoll, associate justice of the Louisiana Supreme Court since 1997; long-time Marksville resident
Chad Lavalais, former LSU and NFL football player
Tommy Neck (pronounced NICK), LSU and NFL football player from the 1960s
Ed Oliver, NFL football player
John H. Overton (1875–1948), U.S. senator, native of Marksville
Gaston Porterie, former Attorney General of the State of Louisiana
Charles Addison Riddle III, District Attorney since 2003; former State Representative, 1992–2003
Little Walter Jacobs, blues musician, 2008 Rock and Roll Hall of Fame

National Guard
1020th Engineer Company (Vertical) of the 527th Engineer Battalion of the 225th Engineer Brigade is located in Marksville.

Small communities in the area
Brouillette
Fifth Ward
Moncla
Spring Bayou
Tunica-Biloxi Indian Reservation

References

Cities in Avoyelles Parish, Louisiana
Cities in Louisiana
Colonial Louisiana
Parish seats in Louisiana
1794 establishments in the Spanish Empire